Lilt was a brand of soft drink manufactured by The Coca-Cola Company and sold only in the United Kingdom, Ireland and Gibraltar. Despite claims made by various news outlets, Lilt has never been sold in the Seychelles.

History
From the 1970s until its dissolution in 2023, Lilt was promoted with the advertising slogan "totally tropical taste."

This famous catch phrase was created by Ken Howlett, who entered a magazine competition and won second prize receiving a ghetto blaster. First prize was a trip to the Caribbean.  

Between 2008 and 2014, The Coca-Cola Company reduced the number of calories in the drink by 56% as part of its efforts to make healthier products in response to the British Government's Public Health Responsibility Deal. The amount of sugar was also reduced alongside the addition of artificial sweeteners (aspartame, acesulfame K and saccharin).

One advertisement in the late 1980s featured the "Lilt Man", a parody of a milkman, delivering Lilt in a "Lilt float", with a song bearing the lyrics "Here comes the Lilt Man." In the late 1990s, it was heavily promoted with advertisements featuring two Jamaican women, Blanche Williams and Hazel Palmer, with one advert parodying a Levi's advert. They became known in the media as the "Lilt Ladies".

In late 2021, the drink was rebranded in Ireland as a sub-brand of Fanta, followed by Great Britain in 2022.

In February 2023, rumoured to be in a long term decline due to poor sponsorship arrangements during the 1990s, it was announced that the Lilt brand would be discontinued, with the drink being fully absorbed into the Fanta brand as 'Fanta Pineapple & Grapefruit'. The rebranded drink became available from 14 February.

Products

References

British soft drink brands
Carbonated drinks
Coca-Cola brands
Fruit sodas
Grapefruit sodas
Irish drinks
Pineapples
Products introduced in 1975
Products and services discontinued in 2023